The Texas Tech University School of Law is an ABA-accredited law school located on the campus of Texas Tech University in Lubbock, Texas. The school offers three academic centers, ten dual-degree programs, a nationally recognized legal writing program, and a competitive advocacy program that has earned 45 national and international championships. Additionally, third-year law students may participate in one of the school's eight clinical programs, which allow students to gain real-world experience while providing free legal representation to low-income individuals. The school focuses on forming practical lawyers who are ready to practice law upon graduation. The student population is approximately 60.4% male and 39.6% female.

Academics & Programs 
Texas Tech School of Law offers a standard Juris Doctor degree program, as well as ten dual-degree programs spanning areas of business, science and engineering, sports management, and government and public administration. Students may pursue academic concentrations in Business Law, Criminal Law and Innocence, and Law and Science. The school is also home to an awarded Advocacy Program and growing Energy Law Program.

The School of Law houses eight clinical programs in which students may participate:

 Capital Punishment Clinic
 Caprock Regional Public Defender Office
 Civil Practice Clinic
 Criminal Defense Clinic
 Family Law and Housing Clinic
 Tax Clinic
 Innocence Clinic
 Advanced Alternative Dispute Resolution Clinic

The School of Law also hosts three academic centers:

 Center for Biodefense, Law, and Public Policy
 Center for Military Law and Policy
 Center for Water Law and Policy

Bar exam performance 
In 2000, Texas Tech University School of Law had a 100% bar passage rate for first-time exam takers for the February 2000 Bar Examination. The school's bar passage rate for first-timers taking the July 2017 exam was 87.12%, placing Texas Tech School of Law in the top three law schools in Texas for 2017 bar passage rates.

Employment 
According to Texas Tech's 2016 ABA-required disclosures, 85.79% of the class of 2016 obtained full-time, long-term, JD-required employment 10 months after graduation.

Costs

The total cost of attendance (indicating the cost of tuition, fees, and living expenses) at Texas Tech for the 2017-2018 academic year is $39,175 for Texas residents and $50,515 for nonresident students. The Law School Transparency estimated 100% debt-financed cost of attendance for three years is $139,550 for Texas residents.

Notable people

Alumni

 Jeff Wentworth '71: Sitting member of the Texas State Senate for the 25th District. Previously, member of  the Texas House of Representatives.
 Phil Johnson '75: Sitting member of the Texas Supreme Court and former chief justice of the 7th Court of Appeals.
 Robert Junell '76: Serves as a judge for the U.S. District Court for the Western District of Texas.
 John Smithee '76: Member, Texas House of Representatives for District 86.
 Karen Tandy '77: first female head of the Drug Enforcement Administration
 Walter Huffman '77:  Judge Advocate General for the United States Army from 1997 until 2001; dean for the law school 2002 until 2009, . Presently, Huff Professor of law at Texas Tech.
 Robert L. Duncan '81, former politician and fourth Chancellor of the Texas Tech University System (from 2014-2018).
 Kem Thompson Frost '83, former Chief Justice of the Court of Appeals for the Fourteenth District of Texas.
 Matthew D. Orwig '84: U.S. Attorney for the Eastern District of Texas  and served until 2007. 
 Mark Lanier '84: In 2008, Mark and his wife Becky financed a $6 million  addition to the law school,
 Timothy Perrin '87: former president of Lubbock Christian University
 Joseph Heflin '93: Served in the Texas House of Representatives for District 85 from 2007 to 2011.
 Andrew Murr Law school year missing: Former county attorney and county judge of Kimble County;   member of the Texas House of Representatives for District 53, elected in 2015
 Dustin Burrows '04: member of the Texas House of Representatives from Lubbock District 83, elected 2014

Faculty

References

External links 
 

 
Educational institutions established in 1967
Law schools in Texas
Law